Stephen of Ripon was the author of the eighth-century hagiographic text Vita Sancti Wilfrithi ("Life of Saint Wilfrid"). Other names once traditionally attributed to him are Eddius Stephanus or Æddi Stephanus, but these names are no longer preferred or accepted by historians today; modern usage tends to favour "Stephen".

Life

Very little is known about the life of Stephen of Ripon. The author of the Vita Sancti Wilfrithi identifies himself as "Stephen, a priest". Bede mentions that Wilfrid brought a singing master from Kent, Ædde Stephanus, to Ripon in 669 to teach chant, and he has traditionally been thought to be the same person as the "Stephen" mentioned. However, there is no more solid evidence that the two names describe the same person. If the two were, in fact, the same, Stephen would have been at least twenty years old when he came north, placing him in his sixties or older at Wilfrid's death in 709.

Regardless of whether or not Stephen the priest, was Wilfrid's singing master from Kent, he appears to have been a follower of Wilfrid and was able to consult individuals who knew Wilfrid as sources for the Vita Sancti Wilfrithi. He wrote for the monks in Ripon, many of whom had known Wilfrid.

Writings

Life of Saint Wilfrid

Stephen's Vita Sancti Wilfrithi is the only documentary source on Saint Wilfrid, aside from Bede's Ecclesiastical History of the English People. It was written shortly after Wilfrid's death in 709. Stephen was asked to write the Life by Acca of Hexham, one of Wilfrid's followers, who later became a bishop and succeeded Wilfrid in the See of Hexham. Although Stephen likely knew Wilfrid and had access to others who knew him, he recounts several extraordinary events and makes use of available text sources. He copies two lines directly from Vita Sancti Cuthberti, otherwise known as the Anonymous Life of Saint Cuthbert. However, unlike many early medieval hagiographies which consisted of strings of miracles attributed to saints, Stephen's Vita takes the form of a chronological narrative and includes specific names and events.

It is unknown what Stephen hoped to accomplish in writing the Vita Sancti Wilfrithi, but scholars have several theories. It has been argued that Stephen's use of lines from Vita Sancti Cuthberti was a way of outdoing the cult based around Cuthbert and replacing him with Wilfrid. However, Stephen's borrowings make up only a tiny percentage of the whole and are entirely located in the early part of the work, making this theory seem unlikely.

The work is biased in favour of Wilfrid and includes explicit comparisons of Wilfrid to Old Testament figures and to the Apostle Paul. Early on, Stephen explains that the community urged him to write the Vita. Stephen's goal in writing could simply have been to describe the community's feelings on the holiness and goodness of the life of Wilfrid, whom they had known personally.

Significance
Stephen's Vita Sancti Wilfrithi was one of the first Anglo-Saxon histories, and the earliest to survive. Bede used it as a source for sections of his Ecclesiastical History of the English People, although he did not acknowledge it.

The Vita Sancti Wilfrithi is also significant in that it provides a contemporary perspective on events that transpired during Wilfrid's lifetime. For instance, it gives an account of the Synod of Whitby that differs from Bede's. While Stephen's writing has come under more criticism than Bede's, the account found in the Vita Sancti Wilfrithi reveals political factors that may have affected the Synod alongside the religious controversies described by Bede.

In fiction
As Eddi, he appears in two works by Rudyard Kipling:
"Eddi's Service", at 
"The Conversion of St Wilfrid", at

Editions
Colgrave, Bertram, ed. & trans. (1927) The Life of Bishop Wilfrid by Eddius Stephanus. Cambridge: Cambridge University Press, 1927, 1985.

Manuscripts 
From: Colgrave, Life of St Wilfrid. pp. xiii-xiv.
1. London, British Library, Cotton Vespasian D. vi. Provenance: probably transferred from Yorkshire before it was held in Canterbury and then acquired by the British Library.
fos. 2-77: 9th century, with 11th-century additions;
fos. 78-125: 11th century, with 12th-century additions on the final page.
2. Oxford, Bodleian Library, Fell vol. III 34a-56b, originally vol. I. Written in late 11th or early 12th century.

References

Bibliography
Abels, Richard (1983) “The Council of Whitby: a study in early Anglo-Saxon politics”, in: The Journal of British Studies; 23.1 (1983), pp. 1–25.
Foley, William Trent (1992) Images of Sanctity in Eddius Stephanus’ “Life of Bishop Wilfred”, an early English saint’s life. Lewiston, NY: Edward Mellen Press.
Heffernan, Thomas J. (1992) Sacred Biography: saints and their biographers in the Middle Ages. New York: Oxford University Press.
Kirby, D. P. (1983) “Bede, Eddius Stephanus and the ‘Life of Wilfrid’”, in: The English Historical Review; 98.386 (1983), pp. 101-14.
Kirby, D. P. (1965) “Problems of Early West Saxon History”, in: The English Historical Review 80.314 (1965), pp. 10–29.
Laynesmith, Mark D. (2000) “Stephen of Ripon and the Bible: allegorical and typological interpretations of the Life of St Wilfrid”, in: Early Medieval Europe 9.2 (2000), pp. 163–82.

External links
 
 

Anglo-Saxon writers
Hagiographers
People from Ripon
Year of birth unknown
Year of death unknown
8th-century English historians
7th-century English clergy
7th-century English writers
7th-century Latin writers
8th-century Latin writers
7th-century Christian monks
8th-century English clergy